Liao Bochao (born 16 July 1987) is a Chinese professional footballer who plays as a full-back for Tianjin Teda in the Chinese Super League.

Club career
Liao started his professional career with Chinese Super League side Tianjin Teda in 2008. On 6 July 2008, he made his senior debut in a league match which Tianjin Teda beat Liaoning Whowin, coming on as a substitute for Bai Yi. He scored his first goal in this match.

Career statistics 
Statistics accurate as of match played 31 December 2019.

Honours

Club
Tianjin Teda
 Chinese FA Cup: 2011

References

External links
 

1987 births
Living people
Chinese footballers
Footballers from Tianjin
Tianjin Jinmen Tiger F.C. players
Association football defenders
Chinese Super League players